Real Madrid Club de Fútbol is a professional association football club based in Madrid, Spain, that plays in La Liga. The club was formed in 1902 as Madrid Football Club, and played its first competitive match on 13 May 1902, when it entered the final of the Campeonato de Copa de S.M. Alfonso XIII. Real Madrid was one of the founding members of La Liga in 1929, and is one of three clubs, along with FC Barcelona and Athletic Bilbao, to have never been relegated from the league. Since then, the club's first team has competed in numerous nationally and internationally organized competitions. Real is the second most successful club in Spanish football, having won 68 domestic titles; a record 35 La Liga titles, 19 Spanish Cups, 12 Spanish Super Cups, 1 Copa Eva Duarte, and 1 League Cup. Real is the most successful club in European and international football, having won 28 official UEFA and FIFA trophies in total.

Raúl holds the record for most overall appearances, having played 741 from 1994 to 2010, ahead of Iker Casillas, who made 725 appearances from 1999 to 2015. Manuel Sanchís, Jr is third with 710 appearances from 1983 to 2001 for the club. Cristiano Ronaldo is the all-time top scorer with 450 goals in 438 appearances from 2009 to 2018. He holds the record for the most goals in a season for real madrid, Ronaldo scored 61 in all competitions during the 2014–15 season and also holds the record for second most league goals scored in a season in La Liga, with 48 goals in 2014–15 La Liga. Karim Benzema is the third-highest scorer with 341 goals, having overtaken Raúl, who is third with 323 goals, in August 2022.

Real Madrid has employed numerous famous players, with four FIFA World Player of the Year, eight Ballon d'Or, two FIFA Ballon d'Or, four European Golden Shoe and three FIFA Club World Cup Golden Ball winners among the previous and current club players.

The list includes notable footballers who have played for Real Madrid. Generally, this means players that have played at least 50 official matches. However, some players who have played fewer matches are also included if they are on Real's list of Legendary Players.

Key

Players whose name is in italics currently play for the club.
The years are the first and last calendar years in which the player appeared in competitive first-team football for the club.
The total appearances and goals comprise those in La Liga, Copa del Rey, Supercopa de España, UEFA Champions League, UEFA Europa League, UEFA Super Cup, FIFA Club World Cup and several now-defunct competitions, including the Campeonato Centro, Copa de la Liga, Copa Eva Duarte, UEFA Cup Winners' Cup, Latin Cup, Copa Iberoamericana and Intercontinental Cup.

List of players
Information correct as of the match played on 14 August 2022.

Team captains
The following players have been official Real Madrid captains. Vice captains are also listed.

Notes

 For a full description of positions see football positions.
d'Or.  Won the Ballon d'Or while at Real Madrid.
FIFA.  Won the FIFA World Player of the Year/The Best FIFA Men's Player award while at Real Madrid.
FIFA d'Or.  Won the FIFA Ballon d'Or while at Real Madrid.
UEFA.  Won the UEFA Best Player in Europe Award/UEFA Club Footballer of the Year while at Real Madrid.
Pichichi. Won the Pichichi Trophy while at Real Madrid.
Zamora. Won the Zamora Trophy while at Real Madrid.
Golden Shoe.  Won the European Golden Shoe while at Real Madrid.
A.  Ricardo Zamora has Real's record of Zamora trophies, with three trophies won (record shared with José Vicente Train).
B.  Alfredo Di Stéfano was the first Real Madrid player to win the Ballon d'Or in 1957.
C.  Puskás is record goalscorer in one match, with six goals (record shared with Benguría).
D.  Santillana is Real's record goalscorer in the Spanish Cup, with 48.
E.  Raúl record appearances maker in all competitions and record appearances maker in La Liga (with 550).
F. Karim Benzema holds the record of appearances for Real Madrid as a foreign player.
G.  Iker Casillas has made the most international appearances for Real Madrid, with 156 games (as of 31 August 2014).
H.  Luís Figo was the first Real Madrid player to win the FIFA World Player of the Year award, in 2001.
I.  Ronaldo scored the fastest goal in Real's history, scoring 14 seconds after the start of the game.
J.  Cristiano Ronaldo is Real Madrid's record goalscorer in all competitions, record goalscorer in La Liga (with 239), record goalscorer in Europe (with 75), including a record 73 goals in the UEFA Champions league, the club's record league scorer in a single season, with 48 goals, and record scorer in all competitions in one season, with 61 goals, player with the highest number of European Golden Shoes (3), player with the highest number of hat-tricks in Spain (33), including a record 28 in La Liga, first player to score five goals twice in La Liga games, player with the highest number of goals in a single UEFA Champions League season, with 17 goals, first player to score against all the opposition teams in La Liga and first player to win the FIFA Ballon d'Or twice (in 2013 and again in 2014).
K.  Eden Hazard is the club's record signing, with a total value of the transfer in excess of £130 million.

References
 
 
 

Specific

 
Real Madrid
Players
Association football player non-biographical articles